Agnee Morcha is a Hindi action movie of Bollywood starring Dharmendra, Ravi Kishan & Mukesh Khanna, directed by Raju Chauhan and produced by Rajesh Kothari. This film was released on 4 April 1997 in the banner of Shiv Dolly Films.

Cast 
 Dharmendra as Kishan Singh Bhatti
 Mukesh Khanna
 Ravi Kishan
 Simran
 Johnny Lever
 Raza Murad

References

External links 
 

1997 films
Indian action films
1997 action films
1990s Hindi-language films
Hindi-language action films